Nightstick , also released as Calhoun, is a 1987 Canadian-American made-for-television action film which had theatrical release and later released to video and to theaters outside the United States.  Directed by Joseph L. Scanlan, the film stars Bruce Fairbairn, Kerrie Keane, Leslie Nielsen, Robert Vaughn, and John Vernon.

Under the working title of Cahoun, production began December 1986 shooting on locations in Toronto and New York.

Plot

Jack Calhoun (Bruce Fairbairn) is a "renegade cop" assigned by his boss Thad Evans (Leslie Nielsen) to ward off a group of terrorists

Cast 

 Bruce Fairbairn as Jack Calhoun
 Kerrie Keane as Robin Malone
 Walker Boone as Roger Bantam
 Tony De Santis as Jerry Bantam
 David Mucci as Pat Bantam
 Robert Vaughn as Ray Melton
 Leslie Nielsen as Thad Evans
 Eric Murphy as Thomas Grant
 Philip Akin as Price
 John Vernon as Adam Beardsly
 Mark McManus as Banker #2
 Chris Benson as Sam
 Ron White as Sid Stanton
 Glen Chin as Hop Sing
 Tony Rosato as Tony
 Jackie Richardson as Woman Singing
 Roger Dunn as Sgt. Finn
 François Klanfer as Dr. Case
 Diana Reis as Gloris Grant
 Sam Moses as Omar
 George Hevenor as Banker #1
 Patricia Moffatt as Banker #3
 Nicholas Pasco as Charlie
 Orest Ulan as FBI Agent Wilkins
 Dave Arkell as FBI Agent Spradley
 Howard Jerome as Mel Silverman
 Michael A. Miranda as Ismael
 Errol Slue as Floyd Edwards
 Aloa El Sayed as Young Arab
 Corinne Conley as Lynette Beardsly
 Reg Dreger as Alley Cop
 John Gardiner as Police Commissioner
 Phillip Jarrett]as Airport Cop #1
 Ralph Small as Airport Cop #2
 Catherine Gallant as Nurse Maria 
 Alan Fawcett as Dr. Fred
 Angelo Rizacos as Jimmy Reilly

Reception

References

External links

1987 films
1980s English-language films
American action television films
American police detective films
Canadian television films
English-language Canadian films
Canadian action films
1987 action films
Films directed by Joseph L. Scanlan
1980s American films
1980s Canadian films